The Hot Potato is a 2012 British comedy crime thriller film. It was directed and written by Tim Lewiston and stars Ray Winstone, Colm Meaney and Jack Huston in the lead roles. The film is a throwback to the crime caper films that were popular in the 1960s and pays homage to several of these, including The Italian Job.

The film premiered on 4 July 2012 at the East End Film Festival.

Plot 

One evening in 1969, a Ministry of Defence's facility in London is completely destroyed by a huge explosion. To their surprise, Danny (Jack Huston) and Kenny (Ray Winstone) come into possession of a strange object from the blast; a large lump of solid uranium which looks remarkably like a hot potato.

The pair quickly learn of their find's potential worth as well as its radioactive dangers. With the aid of Danny's girlfriend, Carole (Lois Winstone) the three set off on an adventure to sell it, dodging police and other criminals also on the hunt for the uranium.

Cast

See also
 "To drop like a hot potato"

References

External links

Official Site

2012 films
Films set in 1969
British crime comedy films
British crime thriller films
2012 crime thriller films
2010s crime comedy films
2012 comedy films
2010s British films